Muhammad Mojlum Khan (born 6 December 1973) is a Bangladeshi-born British non-fiction writer.

Early life
Khan was born in Habiganj District, Bangladesh, and was brought up and educated in England.

Khan studied classical Arabic and traditional Islamic sciences at a darul uloom (Islamic seminary). He graduated with a degree in Business and Social Policy from the University of East Anglia.

Career
Khan is a teacher, writer, literary critic, research scholar and researcher in Islamic thought and history. He has published over 150 essays and articles worldwide, including 100 essays and articles on Islam, comparative religion, contemporary thought and current affairs. Since the age of 19, he has been a regular contributor to The Muslim News. He is also a regular contributor on BBC Radio.

Khan is a former president of a university Islamic society and executive member of Federation of Student Islamic Societies in UK and Eire (FOSIS). He is a fellow of the Royal Asiatic Society of Great Britain and Ireland and a founding director of Bengal Muslim Research Institute UK. He is also chairman of the Ipswich and Suffolk Muslim Council and the manager of the Bangladeshi Support Centre. He is an imam to Her Majesty's Prison Service.

In September 2011, Khan co-ordinated the 1 Big Multicultural Festival, organised by the Bangladeshi Support Centre (BSC).

Awards
Khan is the recipient of one international and two national prizes for his essays on Islam.

Personal life
Khan is married to childminder Fahmida Khan. He lives in Ipswich, Suffolk with his family. In 1988, his father, Muhammad Pathan Yawar Khan, died. He also has two children, Muhtadi Khan (born 2001) and Mustafa Al-amin Khan (born 2003).

Books

See also
 British Bangladeshis
 List of British Bangladeshis

References

External links
 The Muslim 100: The Lives, Thoughts and Achievements of the Most Influential Muslims in History on Google Books
 The Muslim Heritage of Bengal: The Lives, Thoughts and Achievements of Great Muslim Scholars, Writers and Reformers of Bangladesh and West Bengal on Google Books

1973 births
Living people
British Muslims
Bangladeshi emigrants to England
British literary critics
British columnists
21st-century Muslim scholars of Islam
British Asian writers
21st-century British historians
People from Habiganj District
Writers from Ipswich
Alumni of the University of East Anglia
English Sunni Muslim scholars of Islam
20th-century British male writers
Islamic scholars in the United Kingdom